Skenea profunda is a species of sea snail, a marine gastropod mollusk in the family Skeneidae.

A marine nematode Endeolophos skeneae (family Chromadoridae) is epibiotically associated with Skenea profunda

Description

Distribution
This marine species occurs in northern European waters off Spitzbergen.

References

External  links
 Friele H., 1879: Catalog der auf der norwegischen Nordmeer-Expedition bei Spitzbergen gefundenen Mollusken; Jahrbücher der Deutschen Malakozoologischen Gesellschaft 6: 264–286
  Gofas, S.; Le Renard, J.; Bouchet, P. (2001). Mollusca, in: Costello, M.J. et al. (Ed.) (2001). European register of marine species: a check-list of the marine species in Europe and a bibliography of guides to their identification. Collection Patrimoines Naturels, 50: pp. 180–213

profunda
Gastropods described in 1879